Terinos terpander, the royal Assyrian, is a butterfly in the family Nymphalidae. It was described by William Chapman Hewitson in 1862. It is found in the Indomalayan realm.

Subspecies
T. t. terpander (Borneo, Malaysia)
T. t. robertsia (Butler, 1867) (Burma - Singapore)
T. t. blachieri Fruhstorfer, 1914 (Indochina)
T. t. intermedia Godfrey, 1916 (Vietnam)
T. t. tiomanensis Eliot, 1978 (Pulau Tioman, Pulau Aur)
T. t. teos de Nicéville, 1893 (Sumatra)
T. t. niasica Fruhstorfer, 1901 (Nias)
T. t. natunensis Fruhstorfer, 1901 (Natuna Island)
T. t. bangkanensis Fruhstorfer, 1912 (Bangka Island)
T. t. piepersi Martin, 1909 (Java)

Biology
The larva on feeds on Rinorea anguifera.

References

External links
Terinos at Markku Savela's Lepidoptera and Some Other Life Forms

Terinos
Butterflies described in 1862